A Sprig of Asparagus (L'Asperge) is an 1880 oil on canvas painting by Édouard Manet, signed at the top right. It is now in the Musée d'Orsay.

Earlier in 1880 the art collector Charles Ephrussi had commissioned Manet to paint A Bundle of Asapragus for 800 francs. On receiving the work he gave the artist 1000 francs instead and so Manet decided to paint a smaller second work now known as A Sprig of Asparagus. He sent this second work to Ephrussi with a note reading "There was one [sprig] missing from your bundle."

The painting is referenced in Sheila Heti's novels How Should A Person Be? and Pure Color. She has called it her favorite painting. 

Both paintings are mentioned in the roman The Hare with Amber Eyes. A Hidden Inheritance of Edmund de Waal. Charles Ephrussi and Edmund are relatives.

References

Bibliography
  Denis Rouart and Sandra Orienti, Tout l’œuvre peint d'Édouard Manet, Paris, Flammarion, coll. « Les Classiques de l'Art », 1997 (1re éd. 1970), 126 p.
  Olivier Céna, « Manet, inventeur du moderne », Télérama, no 3196, 16 avril 2011 (lire en ligne [archive])
  James H. Rubin (translated by Jeanne Bouniort), Manet : Initiale M, l’œil, une main, Paris, Flammarion, 2011, 416 p.

External links
 

Still life paintings
1880 paintings
Paintings in the collection of the Musée d'Orsay
Paintings by Édouard Manet
Asparagus